The sultans of Zanzibar were the rulers of the Sultanate of Zanzibar, which was created on 19 October 1856 after the death of Said bin Sultan, who had ruled Oman and Zanzibar as the sultan of Oman since 1804. The sultans of Zanzibar were of a cadet branch of the Al Said Dynasty of Oman.

In 1698, Zanzibar became part of the overseas holdings of Oman, falling under the control of the sultan of Oman. In 1832, or 1840 (the date varies among sources), Said bin Sultan moved his capital from Muscat in Oman to Stone Town. He established a ruling Arab elite and encouraged the development of clove plantations, using the island's slave labour. Zanzibar's commerce fell increasingly into the hands of traders from the Indian subcontinent, whom Said encouraged to settle on the island. After his death in 1856, two of his sons, Majid bin Said and Thuwaini bin Said, struggled over the succession, so Zanzibar and Oman were divided into two separate principalities; Thuwaini became the sultan of Oman while Majid became the first sultan of Zanzibar. During his 14-year reign as sultan, Majid consolidated his power around the East African slave trade. His successor, Barghash bin Said, helped abolish the slave trade in Zanzibar and largely developed the country's infrastructure. The third sultan, Khalifa bin Said, also furthered the country's progress toward abolishing slavery.

Until 1886, the sultan of Zanzibar controlled a substantial portion of the east African coast, known as Zanj, and trading routes extending further into the continent, as far as Kindu on the Congo River. That year, the British and Germans secretly met and re-established the area under the sultan's rule. Over the next few years, most of the mainland possessions of the Sultanate were taken by European imperial powers. With the signing of the Heligoland-Zanzibar Treaty in 1890 during Ali bin Said's reign, Zanzibar became a British protectorate. In August 1896, Britain and Zanzibar fought a 38-minute war, the shortest in recorded history, after Khalid bin Barghash had taken power after Hamid bin Thuwaini's death. The British had wanted Hamoud bin Mohammed to become sultan, believing that he would be much easier to work with. The British gave Khalid an hour to vacate the sultan's palace in Stone Town. Khalid failed to do so, and instead assembled an army of 2,800 men to fight the British. The British launched an attack on the palace and other locations around the city. Khalid retreated and later went into exile. Hamoud was then installed as sultan.

In December 1963, Zanzibar was granted independence by the United Kingdom and became a constitutional monarchy within the Commonwealth under the sultan. Sultan Jamshid bin Abdullah was overthrown a month later during the Zanzibar Revolution. Jamshid fled into exile, and the Sultanate was replaced by the People's Republic of Zanzibar and Pemba. In April 1964, the republic was united with Tanganyika to form the United Republic of Tanganyika and Zanzibar, which became known as Tanzania six months later.

Sultans of Zanzibar

Family tree 

Sayyid Said, Sultan of Muscat, Oman and Zanzibar (1797–1856)
Sayyid Thuwaini, Sultan of Muscat and Oman (1821–1866)
 Sayyid Harub (1849–1907)
  IX. Sayyid Khalifa II (26 August 1879 – 9 October 1960; r. 9 December 1911 – 9 October 1960) 9 Al-Said
  X. Sayyid Abdullah (13 February 1911 – 1 July 1963; r. 9 October 1960 – 1 July 1963) 10 Al-Said
  XI. Sayyid Jamshid (b. 16 September 1929; r. 1 July 1963 – 17 January 1964; Head of the Zanzibari royal house: 17 January 1964 – present) 11 Al-Said
 V. Sayyid Hamad (1857 – 25 August 1896; r. 5 March 1893 – 25 August 1896)  5 Al-Busaid
 Sayyid Muhammad (1826–1863)
 VII. Sayyid Hamud (1853 – 18 July 1902; r. 27 August 1896 – 18 July 1902)  7  Al-Said
 VIII. Sayyid Ali II (7 June 1884 – 20 December 1918; r. 18 July 1902 – 9 December 1911)  8 Al-Busaid
 I. Sayyid Majid (1834 – 7 October 1870; r. 19 October 1856 – 7 October 1870) 1 Al-Busaid
 II. Sayyid Barghash (1837 – 26 March 1888; r. 7 October 1870 – 26 March 1888) 2 Al-Busaid
  VI. Sayyid Khalid (15 December 1874 – 19 March 1927; r. 25–27 August 1896) 6 Al-Busaid
 III. Sayyid Khalifa I (1852 – 13 February 1890; r. 26 March 1888 – 13 February 1890) 3 Al-Busaid
 IV. Sayyid Ali I (September 1854 – 5 March 1893; r. 13 February 1890 – 5 March 1893) 4 Al-Busaid

See also

Tanzania
Politics of Tanzania
List of governors of Tanganyika
President of Tanzania
List of heads of state of Tanzania
Prime Minister of Tanzania
List of prime ministers of Tanzania
President of Zanzibar
List of heads of government of Zanzibar
List of rulers of Oman

Footnotes

 Majid bin Said, the youngest son of Said bin Sultan, became the Sultan of Oman after his father's death on 19 October 1856. However, Majid's elder brother, Thuwaini bin Said, contested the accession to power. Following a struggle over the position, it was decided that Zanzibar and Oman would be divided into two separate principalities. Majid would rule as the Sultan of Zanzibar while Thuwaini would rule as the Sultan of Oman.
 From 1886, the United Kingdom and Germany had plotted to obtain parts of the Zanzibar Sultanate for their own empires. In October 1886, a German-British border commission established the Zanj as a 10 nautical mile (19 km) wide strip along most of the coast of East Africa, stretching from Cape Delgado (now in Mozambique) to Kipini (now in Kenya), including Mombasa and Dar es Salaam. Over the next few years, almost all of these mainland possessions were lost to European imperial powers.
 Hamoud bin Mohammed, the son-in-law of Majid bin Said, was supposed to become the Sultan of Zanzibar after Hamid bin Thuwayni's death. However, Khalid bin Bhargash, son of Bargash bin Said, seized the Sultan's palace and declared himself the ruler of Zanzibar. The British, who had supported Hamoud, responded on 26 August by issuing an ultimatum to Khalid and his men to leave the palace within one hour. After he refused, the Royal Navy began firing at the palace and other locations in Stone Town. Khalid assembled an army of 2,800 and stationed them all around the town. Thirty-eight minutes later, Khalid retreated to the German consulate, where he was granted asylum. This conflict, known as the Anglo-Zanzibar War, was the shortest war in recorded history. Khalid later went into exile in Dar es Salaam until being captured by the British in 1916.
After attending the coronation of King George V, Ali decided to abdicate from the throne to live in Europe.
 Abdullah bin Khalifah died from complications of diabetes.
 Jamshid bin Abdullah overthrown on 12 January 1964 during the Zanzibar Revolution. Jamshid managed to flee to Great Britain with his family and ministers.

References 

Bibliography

External links

Omani Arab Rule In Zanzibar

 
Zanzibar, Sultans
Zanzibar
Sultans